Alla Nazimova (Russian: Алла Назимова; born Marem-Ides Leventon, Russian: Марем-Идес Левентон; June 3 [O.S. May 22], 1879 – July 13, 1945) was a Russian-American actress, director, producer and screenwriter.

On Broadway, she was noted for her work in the classic plays of Ibsen, Chekhov and Turgenev. She later moved on to film, where she served many production roles, both writing and directing films under pseudonyms. Her film Salome (1922) is regarded as a cultural landmark.

Nazimova was bisexual and openly conducted relationships with women while being married to a man. She created the Garden of Allah hotel, which became a retreat for many celebrities of the time. She is credited with having originated the phrase "sewing circle" as a discreet code for lesbian or bisexual actresses.

Early life
She was born Marem-Ides Leventon (Russian name: Adelaida Yakovlevna Leventon) in Yalta, Crimea, Russian Empire. Although her accepted birth year is 1879, that is far from certain because there are different sources that indicate 1878 or even 1876.  Her stage name Alla Nazimova was a combination of Alla (a diminutive of Adelaida) and the surname of Nadezhda Nazimova, the heroine of the Russian novel Children of the Streets. She was widely known as just Nazimova. Her name was sometimes transcribed as Alia Nasimoff.

The youngest of three children born to Jewish parents Yakov Abramovich Leventon, a pharmacist, and Sarah Leivievna Gorowitz (later known as Sofia or Sophie Lvovna Gorovitz/Horovitz/Herowitz), who moved to Yalta in 1870 from Kishinev, she grew up in a dysfunctional family. Her parents divorced when she was eight. After her parents separated, she was shuffled among boarding schools, foster homes and relatives. As a teenager she began to pursue an interest in the theatre and took acting lessons at the Academy of Acting in Moscow. She joined Constantin Stanislavski's Moscow Art Theatre using the name of Alla Nazimova for the first time.

Career

Nazimova's theater career blossomed early, and by 1903, she was a major star in Moscow and Saint Petersburg. She toured Europe, including London and Berlin, with her boyfriend Pavel Orlenev, a flamboyant actor and producer. In 1905, they moved to New York City and founded a Russian-language theater on the Lower East Side. The venture was unsuccessful, and Orlenev returned to Russia while Nazimova stayed in New York.

She was signed by the American producer Henry Miller and made her Broadway debut in New York City in 1906 to critical and popular success. Her English-language premiere in November 1906 was in the title role of Hedda Gabler. She reportedly learned English in five months. She quickly became extremely popular (Nazimova's 39th Street Theatre was named after her) and remained a major Broadway star, often starring in works by  Ibsen and Chekhov. Dorothy Parker described her as the finest Hedda Gabler she had ever seen.

Nazimova's film career began when she was 37 years old. Due to her notoriety in a 35-minute 1915 play entitled War Brides, Nazimova made her silent film debut in 1916 in the filmed version of the play, which was produced by Lewis J. Selznick. She was paid $1,000 per day, and the film was a success. A young actor with a bit part in the movie was Richard Barthelmess, whose mother, Caroline W. Harris, had taught Nazimova English. Nazimova had encouraged him to try out for movies and he later became a star. In 1917, she negotiated a contract with Metro Pictures, a precursor to MGM, that included a weekly salary of $13,000. She moved from New York to Hollywood, where she made a number of highly successful films for Metro that earned her considerable money. 

She created and worked under Nazimova Productions from 1917 to 1921. She filled many roles in film production, outside of acting. She served as a director, producer, editor, lighting designer, and received credit for costume design for the film Revelation. She wrote screenplays under the pseudonym Peter M. Winters, and was a director for films credited to the name of her partner Charles Bryant. In her film adaptations of works by such notable writers as Oscar Wilde and Ibsen, she developed filmmaking techniques that were considered daring at the time. Her film projects, including A Doll's House (1922), based on Ibsen, and Salomé (1923), based on Wilde's play, were critical and commercial failures. Salomé, however, has become a cult classic, regarded as a feminist milestone in film. In 2000, the film was added to the National Film Registry. By 1925, she could no longer afford to invest in more films, and financial backers withdrew their support.

In 1927, she became a naturalized citizen of the United States.

Left with few options, she gave up on the film industry, returning to perform on Broadway, notably starring as Natalya Petrovna in Rouben Mamoulian's 1930 New York production of Turgenev's A Month in the Country and an acclaimed performance as Mrs. Alving in Ibsen's Ghosts, which critic Pauline Kael described as the greatest performance she had ever seen on the American stage. In the early 1940s, she returned to films, playing Robert Taylor's mother in Escape (1940) and Tyrone Power's mother in Blood and Sand (1941). This late return to motion pictures fortunately preserves Nazimova and her art on sound film.

Personal life

Marriages

In 1899, she married Sergei Golovin, a fellow actor. From 1912 to 1925, Nazimova maintained a "lavender marriage" with Charles Bryant (1879–1948), a British-born actor. To bolster this arrangement with Bryant, Nazimova kept her marriage to Golovin secret from the press, her fans, and even her friends. In 1923, she arranged to divorce Golovin without traveling to the Soviet Union. Her divorce papers, which arrived in the United States that summer, stated that on May 11, 1923, the marriage of "citizeness Leventon Alla Alexandrovna" and Sergius Arkadyevitch Golovin, "consummated between them in the City Church of Boruysk June 20, 1899", had been officially dissolved. A little over two years later, on November 16, 1925, Charles Bryant, then 43, surprised the press, Nazimova's fans, and Nazimova herself by marrying Marjorie Gilhooley, 23, in Connecticut. When the press uncovered the fact that Charles had listed his current marital status as "single" on his marriage license, the revelation that the marriage between Alla and Charles had been a sham from the beginning embroiled Nazimova in a scandal that damaged her career.

Relationships with women
From 1917 to 1922, Nazimova wielded considerable influence and power in Hollywood. She helped start the careers of both of Rudolph Valentino's wives, Jean Acker and Natacha Rambova. Although she was involved in an affair with Acker, it is debatable as to whether her connection with Rambova ever developed into a sexual affair.

Nevertheless, there were rumors that Nazimova and Rambova were involved in a lesbian affair (they are discussed at length in Dark Lover, Emily Leider's biography of Rudolph Valentino) but those rumors never have been confirmed. She was very impressed by Rambova's skills as an art director, and Rambova designed the innovative sets for Nazimova's film productions of Camille and Salomé. The list of those Nazimova is confirmed to have been involved with romantically includes actress Eva Le Gallienne, film director Dorothy Arzner, writer Mercedes de Acosta, and Oscar Wilde's niece Dolly Wilde.

Bridget Bate Tichenor, a Magic Realist artist and Surrealist painter, was rumored to be one of Nazimova's favored lovers in Hollywood during 1940–1942. The two had been introduced by the poet and art collector Edward James, and according to Tichenor, their intimate relationship angered Nazimova's longtime companion Glesca Marshall.It is believed that Nazimova coined the phrase sewing circle as code to refer to lesbian or bisexual actresses of her day who concealed their true sexuality.

Nazimova lived together with Glesca Marshall from 1929 until Nazimova's death in 1945.

Friends and relations
Edith Luckett, a stage actress and the mother of future U.S. First Lady Nancy Reagan, was a friend of Nazimova, having acted with her onstage. Edith married Kenneth Seymour Robbins, and following the birth of their daughter Nancy in 1921, Nazimova became her godmother. Nazimova continued to be friends with Edith and her second husband, neurosurgeon Loyal Davis, until her death. She was also the aunt of American film producer Val Lewton.

Garden of Alla

Nazimova's private lifestyle gave rise to widespread rumors of outlandish and allegedly debauched parties at her mansion on Sunset Boulevard in Hollywood, California, known as The Garden of Alla, which she leased in 1918 and bought outright the next year. Facing near-bankruptcy in 1926, she converted the 2.5-acre estate into a hotel by building 25 villas on the property. The Garden of Alla Hotel opened in January 1927. But Nazimova was ill-equipped to run a hotel and eventually sold it and returned to Broadway and theatrical tours. By 1930, the hotel had been purchased by Central Holding Corporation, which changed the name to the Garden of Allah Hotel. When Nazimova moved back to Hollywood in 1938, she rented Villa 24 at the hotel and lived there until she died.

Death and memorials
On July 13, 1945, Nazimova died of a coronary thrombosis, age 66, in the Good Samaritan Hospital in Los Angeles. Her ashes were interred in Forest Lawn Memorial Park Cemetery in Glendale, California. Her contributions to the film industry have been recognized with a star on the Hollywood Walk of Fame.

Legacy
Nazimova has been depicted a number of times in film and onstage. The first two were biographical films about Rudolph Valentino: The Legend of Valentino (1975), in which she was portrayed by Alicia Bond; and Valentino (1977), in which she was portrayed by Leslie Caron. She was featured in two 2013 silent films about Hollywood's silent movie era: Return to Babylon, in which she was played by Laura Harring, and Silent Life, based on the life of Rudolph Valentino, where she was played by Sherilyn Fenn.The character of Nazimova also appears in Dominick Argento's opera Dream of Valentino, in which she also played the violin. Nazimova was also featured in make-up artist Kevyn Aucoin's 2004 book Face Forward, in which he made up Isabella Rossellini to resemble her, particularly as posed in a certain photograph.

Actress Romy Nordlinger first portrayed Alla Nazimova in The Society for the Preservation of Theatrical History production of Stage Struck: From Kemble to Kate staged at the Snapple Theater Center in New York City in December 2013. In Fall 2016, PLACES, a multimedia solo show about Alla Nazimova, supported by the League of Professional Theatre Women's Heritage Program, written and performed by Romy Nordlinger debuted at Playhouse Theatre for a limited run.

The Garden of Allah cabaret was an influential LGBTQ+ cabaret venue in the mid-20th century that took its name and inspiration from Nazimova's original Garden of Alla.

Nazimova also appears in Medusa's Web, a novel by fantasy-fiction writer Tim Powers.

Filmography

See also

 List of American film actresses
 List of film producers
 List of Jewish actors
 List of people from California
 List of people from New York City
 List of people from Ukraine
 List of Russian people
 List of women writers

References

Further reading
 Golden, Eve (2001). Golden Images: 41 Essays on Silent Film Stars. Jefferson, North Carolina: McFarland & Company. .
 Lewton, Lucy Olga (1988). Alla Nazimova, My Aunt, Tragedienne: A Personal Memoir. Minuteman Press.
 Smith, Frederick James (September 1918).  "Those Nazimova Eyes!" in Picture Play.

External links

 Alla Nazimova Society
 
 
 
 Alla Nazimova  at the Women Film Pioneers Project
 History of the Garden of Allah with photos 
 The Vanished Garden of Carnal Abandon
 Nazimova photo gallery NYP Library
 Photographs and literature on Alla Nazimova

1870s births
1945 deaths
Crimean Jews
19th-century actresses from the Russian Empire
Russian stage actresses
19th-century people from the Russian Empire
19th-century women writers from the Russian Empire
19th-century writers from the Russian Empire
20th-century American actresses
20th-century Russian people
20th-century American women writers
Actresses from Moscow
Actresses from New York City
American film producers
American people of Russian-Jewish descent
Screenwriters from New York (state)
American silent film actresses
American stage actresses
LGBT actresses
Burials at Forest Lawn Memorial Park (Glendale)
Actresses from the Russian Empire
Emigrants from the Russian Empire to the United States
Writers from the Russian Empire
Jewish American actresses
Jews and Judaism in New York City
LGBT people from California
Ukrainian bisexual people
Russian LGBT actors
LGBT Jews
Russian LGBT screenwriters
People from Yalta
People with acquired American citizenship
American women screenwriters
Writers from New York City
Deaths from coronary thrombosis
Women film pioneers
Age controversies
American women film producers
Jewish Ukrainian actors
20th-century American screenwriters
20th-century Russian women
Bisexual actresses
American bisexual actors
American LGBT screenwriters
Bisexual Jews